Flavius Arbitio (fl. 354–366 AD) was a Roman general and Consul who lived in the middle of the 4th century AD.

In the Reign of Constantius II 
Arbitio was a general of Constantine I. Under Constantius II, the son and successor of Constantine, he became magister equitum (commander of the cavalry). Arbitio was a well trusted courtier of Constantius, and some modern historians have suggested he was his military strongman. In 355 he was made consul together with Quintus Flavius Maesius Egnatius Lollianus.

Arbitio intrigued against Claudius Silvanus, Ursicinus and Barbatio and played a role in their downfalls. Historian Ammianus Marcellinus says he was "keen and eager in plotting treachery", and describes him as "fickle flatterer" to Constantius II.

In the Reign of Julian 
After the death of Constantius in 361, he was appointed chairman of the Chalcedon tribunal by the new Emperor Julian. In this function he was responsible for the conviction of Paulus Catena and many ministers and followers of Constantius. Arbitio did not take part in the Persian campaign of Julian, but instead retired to live as a private citizen.

In the Reign of Valens 
A couple of years after Julian's death, a maternal relative of Julian named Procopius made an attempt to usurp the Eastern Empire. Arbitio himself was courted by this Procopius. However, Arbitio ignored the summons of Procopius, who, in response, confiscated his properties. This action led Arbitio to join Procopius' opponent, Valens, who appointed Arbitio "ad hoc magister militum". During the subsequent campaign, Arbitio was able to convince Gomoarius, a general in the army of Procopius and an old friend of Arbitio, to desert to Valens. Eventually, Procopius was deserted by most of his troops, and attempted to hide from his fate, but was tied up by two of his attendants and turned over to Valens, who had both the usurper and his betrayers executed.

What happened to Arbitio after this time is unknown, although it is reasonable to assume that he retired, and subsequently died without taking any further part in matters of state.

Footnotes

Sources 
 Ammianus Marcellinus, Loeb Classical Library
 Lenski, N.E., ''Failure of empire: Valens and the Roman State in the fourth century A.D. (2002)

4th-century Gallo-Roman people
Ancient Roman generals
Generals of Constantine the Great
Generals of Constantius II
Generals of Valens
Imperial Roman consuls
Magistri equitum (Roman Empire)